The Sultanate of Kano was a Hausa kingdom in the north of what is now Nigeria that dates back to 1349, when the king of Kano, Ali Yaji (1349–1385), dissolved the cult of Tsumbubra and proclaimed Kano a sultanate. Before 1000 AD, Kano had been ruled as an Animist Hausa Kingdom, the Kingdom of Kano. The sultanate lasted until the Fulani Jihad in 1805 and the assassination of the last sultan of Kano in 1807. The sultanate was then replaced by the Kano Emirate, subject to the Sokoto Caliphate. The capital is now the modern city of Kano in Kano State.

History

Rise of the Sultanate

Ali Yaji (1349–85) accepted Islam from the Wangarawa people, a Soninke sub-tribe from Mali. He then relinquished the Cult of Tsumbubura, the principal cult of the patron goddess of Kano. According to the Kano Chronicle, in around 1350, the Cult of Tsumbubura, which was based in Santolo Hill, rebelled against Yaji. A civil war ensued, culminating in the Battle of Santolo. After his victory, Ali Yaji set out on a wave of conquests. He conquered Rano, extending Kano's reach, and launched a successful expedition into the Kwararafa region. 

During the reign of Kanejeji (1390-1410), the cult of Tsumbubura saw a momentary resurgence. After failing to pacify Zukzuk, the parent state of the Sultanate of Zazzau, Kanajeji converted to Hausa Animism. He introduced the armored cavalry Lifidi, which he used to subdue the Zukzuk occupying the city of Turunku. 

During the Reign of Umaru, son of Kanejeji (1410-1421), Sufi Islam made its first inroads to Kano. The Kano Chronicle recalls Umaru's reign as that of peace and prosperity. He restored the Sultanate and strengthened religious institutions with Sufism.

Kanoan Empire
In the reign of Muhammadu Rumfa, the Sultanate succeeded in maintaining its independence when the Sultan took the daughter of Askia the Great, Auwa, as his wife. Later on, the rebellion of Kanta of Kebbi against the Songhai allowed the sultanate to attempt expansion into former Songhai tributary states. Auwa later on became the first female Madaki of Kano and guided her grandson, Muhammadu Kisoki, to assert the First Kanoan Empire. In his reign, the Sultan of Kano was said to have ruled the whole of the Hausa land. Both Abubakr Kado (1565–73) and Muhammadu Shashere (1573–82) attempted to subdue Borno but failed; however, they maintained Kano's hold on the rest of Hausa land and Kwararrafa.
The Empire lasted until the reign of Muhammadu Nazaki (1618–23). A decline in trade throughout the Sudanic area, possibly caused by environmental degradation, has been cited as probable cause. Ancient cities like Wadan and other Songhai strongholds experienced similar misfortunes.

House of Kutumbi

Decline and Fall

 Kano then became an emirate subject to Sokoto.

See also
List of rulers of Kano
Bagauda Dynasty
Kano Chronicle

References

Sahelian kingdoms
History of Northern Nigeria